This is an alphabetical list of villages in Purba Medinipur district, West Bengal, India.

A–C 

 Alangiri
 Bara Bankuya
 Baratala
 Bargoda
 Bhabanipur
 Bhagabanpur
 Bhogpur
 Bhupatinagar
 Brajalalchak
 Chaitanyapur
 Chak Srikrishnapur
 Chandipur
 Chatara

D 

 Daisai
 Dakshin Maynadal
 Dalimbachak
 Dariapur
 Depal
 Dholmari
 Dihibahiri
 Dumardari
 Durmut

G–J 

 Gangadharbar
 Geonkhali
 Golara Nij
 Jabda
 Janka
 Janu Basan
 Jukhia
 Junput

K 

 Kajlagarh
 Kalaberia
 Kamarda
 Kharipukuria
 Khejuri
 Kishorchak
 Kismat Bajkul
 Kukrahati

M–P 

 Madhabpur
 Mahishadal
 Majna
 Mandarmani
 Marishda
 Moyna
 Namalbarh
 Nandakumar
 Nayachar
 Palpara
 Panchetgarh
 Panchrol
 Patashpur
 Pratapdighi
 Purbba Gopalpur

R–U 

 Ramchandrapur
 Ramnagar
 Reyepara
 Shankarpur
 Shipur
 Shyamsundarpur Patna
 Silaberia
 Sona Chura
 Srigouri
 Srikantha
 Sutahata
 Tethi Bari
 Tilkhoja
 Uttar Mechogram

Purba Medinipur district